William Pye (8 November 1930 – January 2010) was an English footballer, who played as an inside forward in the Football League for Chester.

References

1930 births
2010 deaths
Chester City F.C. players
Stockport County F.C. players
Prescot Cables F.C. players
Association football inside forwards
English Football League players
People from Rainford
English footballers